Studenica may refer to:

 Studenica, Kosovo (peak), in the Jezerska planina mountains, Kosovo
 Studenica (peak), north Macedonia
 Studenica (river), a tributary to the Ibar river in Serbia
 Studenica Monastery, a 12th-century Serbian Orthodox monastery in central Serbia